Cinderblock is a supervillain who appeared in DC Comics. He first appeared in the Teen Titans cartoon, and was later incorporated into the comics following Final Crisis.

Fictional character biography

Teen Titans (animated series)
Cinderblock is a humanoid concrete monster whose vocal effects were provided by Dee Bradley Baker. In "Divide and Conquer", Cinderblock is used by Slade to break Plasmus out of prison after Robin and Cyborg messed up their combo move which resulted in an attempted prison break and Cyborg leaving the Teen Titans after an argument with Robin. After Cinderblock unleashed Plasmus, Slade send Cinderblock to attack the city while the Teen Titans were busy fighting Plasmus. He was taken down by Cyborg who reunited with the Teen Titans to take down Plasmus.

In "Apprentice" Pt. 1, Robin ended up fighting Cinderblock in the sewers while looking for Slade's hideout. He was easily defeated by Robin due to a tracking device planted on him that led Robin to Slade.

In two-part episode "Aftershock", Slade had Terra bust out Cinderblock, Overload, and Plasmus and dispatched them to different parts of the city. Robin and Starfire ended up fighting Cinderblock until Terra attacked them. Cinderblock attacked the Teen Titans by combining with Overload and Plasmus to form Ternion. This composite monster was defeated by the Teen Titans.

In "Haunted", the Teen Titans ended up fighting Cinderblock in the forest until Robin saw what appeared to be Slade. Because of Robin going after Slade with Starfire with him, Cinderblock ended up getting away.

He was a member of the Brotherhood of Evil as seen at the end of "Homecoming". In "Calling All Titans", Cinderblock was paired up with Johnny Rancid to capture Más y Menos, but only succeeded in capturing Menos. In "Titans Together", Cinderblock was instrumental in Beast Boy's plan to infiltrate the Brotherhood of Evil's secret base by having Jericho take over his body while carrying Beast Boy, Más, Pantha, and Herald. When Adonis, André LeBlanc, Mammoth, and Private H.I.V.E. ran into him and told him that Brain is about to freeze Robin, Cinderblock spoke causing Private H.I.V.E. to ask when Cinderblock started talking. When Jericho left Cinderblock's body, it fell to the floor dazed. He participated in the subsequent all-out fight against the assembled Titans, but he was defeated. It was not known if he was frozen or not.

Comics
Recently, Cinderblock has appeared in comics as part of the main DC Universe. He is initially shown battling the newest incarnation of Teen Titans in downtown San Francisco, and is somehow able to absorb most of their attacks with little damage. However, Static is able to distract Cinderblock long enough for Beast Boy and Wonder Girl to impale him through the back with a large metal pipe, causing his body to crumble. This does not defeat Cinderblock, and his body begins to reform itself. Before he can fully heal, Bombshell hurls his head into the San Francisco Bay. Though his ultimate fate is unknown, Static is later seen asking Aquagirl to retrieve the severed head from the bay.

One notable difference between the comic and the cartoon versions is that the comic version can speak, albeit in sentence fragments.

Powers and abilities
Cinderblock is made of concrete and has super-strength and durability.

When Cinderblock appeared in the comics, he also purportedly has the power to regenerate his body when it is shattered.

In other media

Television
Cinderblock appears in Teen Titans Go!, voiced again by Dee Bradley Baker.

Video games
Cinderblock also appeared in the Teen Titans videogame.

References

External links
 Cinderblock at Comic Vine

Comics characters introduced in 2009
DC Comics characters with accelerated healing
DC Comics characters with superhuman strength
DC Comics male supervillains
DC Comics metahumans
Fictional henchmen
Television characters introduced in 2003